Richard MacDonnell LL.D., D.D., S.F.T.C.D. (1787–1867) was an Irish cleric and academic, who became the Reformist and 29th Provost of Trinity College Dublin. He was also the projector of Sorrento Terrace, Dalkey, today known as the most expensive row of houses in Ireland.

Background
MacDonnell, of the Tynekill MacDonnells of Leinster, was the son of Robert MacDonnell (1764–1821) of High Park, near Douglas, County Cork, and Susanna Nugent (1766–1836) of Ardmore, County Waterford, of the Cloncoskraine Nugents in the same county. For much of his life, his father had been prosperous, with a revenue appointment at Cork found for him by George Lowther, a family friend. Instead of retirement, he found property prices fell after 1815 and died disappointed.

Trinity College Dublin
Educated at Trinity College Dublin (1800–1805), MacDonnell was elected a scholar in 1803. In 1808 he was elected a lay Fellow at Trinity which allowed him to practise at the Irish Bar. He was awarded his LL.D. in 1813, but gave up his legal career to take holy orders the same year. The rest of his career was spent at Trinity College, where he was a Senior Fellow (1836–1852), Professor of Oratory (1816–1852) and an "efficient" Bursar (1836–1844), bringing the accounts of the collegiate estates into satisfactory order. In 1852, George Villiers, 4th Earl of Clarendon, Lord-Lieutenant of Ireland, appointed him the 29th Provost of Trinity College Dublin, succeeding Franc Sadleir, and he took up residence at the Provost's House. He held the position for 15 years until his death in 1867.

From 1820 to 1827 he was the Donegall Lecturer in Mathematics at Trinity College Dublin.

MacDonnell advocated Catholic Emancipation, at a time when it was unpopular within Trinity. His broad views encompassed both politics and education, and the significant changes he brought about are testament to firmness of character. His period of office is noted for the number of new statutes brought in, which transformed the college code of laws. It gave Trinity "a fresh impetus in its career and usefulness". Another source described him as 'clever but very lazy'.

MacDonnell was said to have had 'an excellent dry sense of humour', demonstrated on one occasion when showing a lady around the impressive Trinity College Library, Dublin. She, clasping her hands together, exclaimed, 'Oh Mr. Provost, pray Mr. Provost, have you read all these books?', to which he replied, 'in time my dear lady, in time'. On another occasion, after the plates had been cleared between the courses of a dinner he was hosting, his butler quietly placed a sugar cube on his bald head. Engaging his guests on a serious subject, his parrot would by then have flown into the dining room and seated itself on the Provost's head to eat the sugar cube, as the Provost continued with his philosophical musings, giving the impression of being completely unfazed.

Sorrento Terrace, Dalkey

MacDonnell had inherited Knocklyon House near Dalkey, but after his mother died there the previous year, in 1837 he leased it out and bought a plot of land by the sea front at Dalkey, where he built a new country retreat, Sorrento Cottage, now owned by The Edge of the Irish rock band U2. Named after Sorrento on the Bay of Naples, the allure of Sorrento Terrace is its situation and the view across Killiney Bay to the Wicklow Mountains, the Great Sugar Loaf taking the place of Mount Vesuvius.

In the early 1840s, MacDonnell devised a plan for the construction of 22 houses right into the corner near the boundaries of the cottage, a huge undertaking at the time that was stalled almost immediately due to the Great Famine - the family having decided to help those around them rather than themselves. In 1845, the family had built the first and largest of the terrace residences, 'Sorrento House', and then MacDonnell leased the rest of the land to his son, Hercules Henry Graves MacDonnell, who from the 1850s built the remaining houses at a price of £1,000 each. The family stipulated that each house had to adhere strictly to the design of architects Frederick Darley and Nathaniel Montgomery. The houses today are known as 'millionaire's row', famous for being the most expensive row of houses in Ireland.

Family
In 1810, Richard MacDonnell married Jane Graves, daughter of the Very Rev. Richard Graves, and sister of Robert James Graves. They were the parents of fourteen children, including Sir Richard Graves MacDonnell and Major-General Arthur Robert MacDonnell. He was the uncle of Francis Brinkley and Richard Charles Mayne, and the uncle and guardian of Edmund Allen Meredith, the principal of McGill University in Montreal.

Arms

References

1787 births
1867 deaths
Donegall Lecturers of Mathematics at Trinity College Dublin
Fellows of Trinity College Dublin
Irish mathematicians
People from County Cork
Provosts of Trinity College Dublin